Nettlecombe is a farming hamlet on the Isle of Wight. It is the site of a deserted medieval village and there is evidence of earthworks close to the present hamlet.
There are several fishing lakes in Nettlecombe.

It lies along Nettlecombe Lane, about half a mile north-east of Whitwell. Until 1952, the Isle of Wight Central Railway had a station on Nettlecombe Lane.

References

External links

Map of Nettlecombe

Villages on the Isle of Wight